RBK International Academy (RBKIA) is an IB continuum world school established in 2007 along with the Cambridge IGCSE option in grades 9 and 10. The school is under the Babubhai Kanakia Foundation.

IB and IGCSE curriculum 

 IBDP (Completed 2 programme evaluations in 2018)
 PYP (Completing two programme evaluations in 2018)
 MYP (Completed one programme evaluation in 2017)
 IGCSE (Authorised in 2007)

Awards and accolades 

Mid-day: Excellence in International School Education, Central Mumbai 2019
British Council: International School Award 2017-20 for "Outstanding Development of The International Dimension in the Curriculum"
 Future 50: Top 50 Schools in India (International Curriculum)
 Mid-day: Excellence in Diverse and Holistic Curriculum, Central Mumbai 2018
 India Today: Excellence in Innovation in Education 2017
 Times of India: second rank in International Curriculum (Zone C) 2017
science

Infrastructural facilities 
 Four science labs(integrated lab, biology lab, chemistry lab, and physics lab all fully equipped), two computer science labs and a math lab.
 An information and resource centre with more than 10,000 books.
 Auditorium, two music studios, dance studio, two music studios, two art studios and a drama studio.
 wi-fi enabled campus.
 Playground comprising a football field, cricket pitches, skating ring, lawn tennis and basketball court.

For sports activities and to encourage healthy competition, the students are distributed into 4 houses and the attributes for the best all-round house includes the following:

 Major games: drill and fitness, football, cricket, athletics, march past, basketball and tug of war.
 Minor games: table tennis, badminton, tennis and carrom.
 Co-curricular activities: elocution, debates, MUN, dance, music and drama.
 Sports as a subject area in PYP/MYP and can take PE in IGCSE too as a subject.

Activities provided:
 Relay for Life
 Sports Day
 Student Council elections
 Celebrations of all Hindu Festivals

External links
https://kanakiaschools.org/

International schools in Mumbai
Schools in Chembur